Miyaneh-ye Sofla (also Romanized as Mīyāneh-ye Soflá) is a village in Bakesh-e Do Rural District, in the Central District of Mamasani County, Fars Province, Iran. At the 2006 census, its population was 382, in 77 families.

References 

Populated places in Mamasani County